Earl Thompson Ingarfield Jr. (born January 30, 1959) is an American former professional ice hockey player who played 41 National Hockey League games for the Atlanta/Calgary Flames and Detroit Red Wings between 1979 and 1981. Ingarfield recorded four goals and four assists in 39 regular season games, and added one assist in two playoff games for the Atlanta Flames.

He is the son of former NHL player Earl Ingarfield Sr. Ingarfield Jr. was born in Manhasset, New York where he played NY metro league junior hockey. He moved to Canada and his father's hometown of Lethbridge, Alberta as a teenager in order to hone his skills in the Western Canada Junior Hockey League.

Career statistics

Regular season and playoffs

See also
List of family relations in the National Hockey League

External links

1959 births
Adirondack Red Wings players
American men's ice hockey left wingers
Atlanta Flames players
Birmingham Bulls (CHL) players
Calgary Flames players
Canadian ice hockey left wingers
Detroit Red Wings players
Sportspeople from Lethbridge
Ice hockey players from New York (state)
Indianapolis Checkers players
Lethbridge Broncos players
Living people
People from Manhasset, New York
Peoria Rivermen (IHL) players
Regina Pats players
Springfield Indians players
Taber Golden Suns players
Undrafted National Hockey League players
Ice hockey people from Alberta